The Chief of Staff to the President, or Chief Presidential Secretary, is the highest-ranking employee of the Blue House and serves as chief of staff to the President of South Korea. The chief presidential secretary is traditionally one of the first officials appointed by an incoming president. Former President Moon Jae-in was a former chief of staff.

List of chiefs of staff

See also 
 Chief Presidential Secretary for Policy
 Office of the President (South Korea)
 Senior Presidential Secretary
 President of South Korea
 Government of South Korea
 Politics of South Korea
 White House Chief of Staff
 Chief Cabinet Secretary

References